Biokovo is the second-highest mountain range in Croatia, located along the Dalmatian coast of the Adriatic Sea, between the rivers of Cetina and Neretva.

It is sometimes referred to as Bijakovo, especially among inhabitants of the eastern side of the mountain. Its highest peak is Sveti Jure (Saint George), at 1762 m.a.s.l. It shows a typical karst landscape. Atop the peak there is a powerful FM and DVB-T transmitter.

The 196 km2 of its area is protected as a nature park with over 1,500 plant and animal species, some of which are endemic.

Biokovo is one in a line of Dinaric Alps stretching along the Dalmatian coast - northwest of it is Mosor and southeast are Sutvid and Rilić. To the east, the Šibenik runs in parallel.

Zabiokovlje, a mountainous area in Biokovo, includes such townlets and villages as Gornja Brela, Zadvarje, Žeževica, Grabovac, Rastovac, Zagvozd, Župa, Rašćane and Kozica. Major economic activities there were cattle raising, grape growing, and hunting. Part of this area is in the Biokovo Nature Park. To aid hikers, the Biokovo Nature Park Visitor Center is in downtown Makarska.

However, Biokovo can be perilous if hiking unprepared - tourists erroneously imagine peaks to be closer than they are and, oblivious to the danger, have been known to go hiking wearing flip-flops, without water, wearing shirts with military camouflage patterns making them harder to spot for search and rescue teams. From 1976 to 2007, 24 hikers have died on Biokovo, while 37 had to be rescued.

Professional road bicycle racing
Sveti Jure has recently found itself included as a climb in professional road bicycle races. It was visited for the first time on the second stage of the 2017 Tour of Croatia. However, due to bad weather the race organisers decided to shorten the stage in accordance with the UCI Extreme weather protocol. The final route was shortened by 15,2 km, moving the finish line down to Vrata Biokova on an altitude of 820 meters.

The stage was won by Croatian rider Kristijan Đurasek of the team UAE Team Emirates, outsprinting Jaime Rosón (Caja Rural–Seguros RGA) with eventual general classification winner Vincenzo Nibali (Bahrain-Merida) finishing third, three seconds down.

The climb was revisited at the 2018 Tour of Croatia,
where it was included as a 28 km long climb serving as summit finish on the third stage, which was dubbed as the queen stage of that year's edition. The stage was won by Belarusian rider Kanstantsin Siutsou riding for Team Bahrain-Merida, after 75 minutes of climbing.

See also
 List of mountains in Croatia
 Amfora Pit

References

External links

 Biokovo photos 
 Biokovo at the Croatian Mountaineering Association 
 Biokovo picture

Mountain ranges of Croatia
Nature parks of Croatia
Landforms of Split-Dalmatia County